Alan & Naomi is a 1992 film about the friendship between two children in 1944 Brooklyn. Lukas Haas and Vanessa Zaoui star as the title characters, and the screenplay is based on a 1977 novel of the same name by Myron Levoy.

Premise
After initial urging from his parents, 14-year-old Alan Silverman (Haas) develops an emotional friendship with Naomi Kirshenbaum (Zaoui), who has been deeply troubled since seeing her father killed by the Nazis in Europe.

Background

Myron Levoy's original 1977 novel was an American Book Award Finalist for Children's Literature and an honor book for the Jane Addams Children's Book Award, the Boston Globe-Horn Book Award and The Horn Book. Alan & Naomi received the National Book Awards For Children's Literature in Germany and Austria, and the Dutch Silver Pencil Prize. In 1986 Alan & Naomi was adapted for a theatrical play, Geheime Freunde, by Rudolf Herfurtner. The novel has been translated into eleven languages.

Production
Alan & Naomi was the first project from Leucadia Film Corporation, a Salt Lake City, Utah company founded in 1989 "by producers Sterling Van Wagenen and David Anderson and entrepreneur Ian Cumming". It was also Van Wagenen's theatrical directorial debut; in the mid-1980s, he had also helmed a Holocaust television documentary called Inside the Vicious Heart.

Release
During its original 1992 run, Alan & Naomi was released in 100 theatres in 19 U.S. cities. On February 8, 1999, Canadian family-entertainment company CINAR acquired the film as part of its purchase of the twelve-title Leucadia library.

Reception
The film won the Crystal Heart Award at the 1992 Heartland Film Festival. Vanessa Zaoui was also nominated for the 1993 Young Artist Award for Best Young Actress Co-starring in a Motion Picture.

References

External links
 

1992 drama films
1992 films
1990s English-language films
Films set in 1944
Films set in Brooklyn
Films shot in North Carolina
American drama films
1990s American films
American independent films
1992 directorial debut films
1992 independent films